John L'Ecuyer (born November 15, 1964) is a Canadian film and television director.

Biography
John L'Ecuyer's first feature, Curtis's Charm (1995), was an adaptation of a Jim Carroll story. The film received a Special Jury Citation as Best Canadian Feature Film at the 1995 Toronto International Film Festival. and had a limited theatrical release in North America. Executive produced by Atom Egoyan and Patricia Rozema the film's budget was 125K (CDN).

Also at TIFF that year, L'Ecuyer's short film UseOnceAndDestroy (1995)* received another Special Jury Citation at the festival, as Best Canadian Short Film.

L'Ecuyer's other feature film credits include Saint Jude (2000- TIFF plus multiple international festivals),  Confessions of a Rabid Dog (TIFF and HOTDOCS + multiple international festivals)  his French-language feature Le Gout Des Jeunes Filles, (On the Verge of a Fever) (2006 - TIFF plus multiple international festivals). L'Ecuyer directed the feature film The Riverbank (2012 - premiere at the Sudbury Film Festival as its opening film).

He is co-executive producer of The Limits (2007), a debut feature film by executive producers Maria Kennedy, Drazen Baric and director Ben Mazzotta.

His feature documentary, Confessions of a Rabid Dog, won Best Social Documentary at HotDocs.

He has directed over 15 TV feature films including Prom Queen (CTV) - premiered as a Gala screening at the Palm Springs International Film Festival. The controversial film about the Montreal abortion doctor called, The Henry Morgenthaler Affair (CBC), the addiction/rehab film written by esteemed writer Cris Cole The Good Times Are Killing Me (CTV), and the anti-bullying film TAGGED: The Jonathon Wamback Story  (CTV) as well as the TV movie In God's Country, a fiction film detailing the escape of a woman from a Mormon polygamous community and her adaptation to life in mainstream Canadian society.

150+ hours of dramatic TV episodic work: A few 'selected' examples: Murdoch Mysteries  (TV feature) Under The Dragon's Tale and multiple episodes over several seasons- CBC/Rogers), Da Vinci's Inquest (CBC- multiple eps), Blue Murder (7 episodes over 2 seasons GLOBAL TV) --The Listener (CTV) Queer as Folk (Showtime), Live Through This (MTV, multiple episodes), Just Cause (PAX), The Guard (CBC 2 episodes) and six one-hour directing credits for the A&E series Nero Wolfe starring Timothy Hutton.

L'Ecuyer directed and creative produced 24 one-hour dramatic episodes over four seasons of ReGenesis (TMN/HBO Canada) starring Peter Outerbridge, Victor Garber, Elliot Page, Wendy Crewson amongst others.

Recently  (up to 2019/20) L'Ecuyer completed his third season and 12th one-hour dramatic episodes of CBC's The Detectives (CBC/ S2 Winner CSA Best Dramatic Factual series) Rogers/OMNI's Award Winning Mandarin/English crime series Blood & Water (complete first season 8 episodes TV series Rogers/OMNI - CSA Nomination Best Dramatic series). The gritty bikers series Gangland Undercover (2 episodes -A/E), Real Detective (2 episodes - Netflix/Discovery ID) as well as Nickelodeon's hit teen TV series Make It Pop and The Forbidden World (multiple episodes).

John L'Ecuyer studied at Ryerson Polytechnical Institute in Toronto, where his classmates included screenwriter Brad Abraham. His brother Gerald L'Ecuyer is also a film and television director.

*Based on L'Ecuyer's book UseOnceAndDestroy originally published in 1998 by Gutter Press as a PAGES edition.

Filmography

Director

Writer

Producer

References

External links
 
 Northern Stars profile

1964 births
Living people
20th-century Canadian male writers
20th-century Canadian screenwriters
21st-century Canadian male writers
21st-century Canadian screenwriters
Canadian male screenwriters
Canadian television directors
Film directors from Montreal
Screenwriters from Quebec
Toronto Metropolitan University alumni
Writers from Montreal